The 2020 General Tire #AnywhereIsPossible 200 was the fourth stock car race of the 2020 ARCA Menards Series and the 36th iteration of the event. The race was held on Friday, June 26, 2020, in Long Pond, Pennsylvania, at Pocono Raceway, a 2.5 miles (4.0 km) triangular permanent course. The race took the scheduled 80 laps to complete. At race's end, Ty Gibbs of Joe Gibbs Racing would lead a dominant race to win his third career ARCA Menards Series win and his first of the season. To fill out the podium, Chandler Smith of Venturini Motorsports and Sam Mayer of GMS Racing would finish second and third, respectively.

Background 

The race was held at Pocono Raceway, which is a three-turn superspeedway located in Long Pond, Pennsylvania. The track hosts two annual NASCAR Sprint Cup Series races, as well as one Xfinity Series and Camping World Truck Series event. Until 2019, the track also hosted an IndyCar Series race.

Pocono Raceway is one of a very few NASCAR tracks not owned by either Speedway Motorsports, Inc. or International Speedway Corporation. It is operated by the Igdalsky siblings Brandon, Nicholas, and sister Ashley, and cousins Joseph IV and Chase Mattioli, all of whom are third-generation members of the family-owned Mattco Inc, started by Joseph II and Rose Mattioli.

Outside of the NASCAR races, the track is used throughout the year by Sports Car Club of America (SCCA) and motorcycle clubs as well as racing schools and an IndyCar race. The triangular oval also has three separate infield sections of racetrack – North Course, East Course and South Course. Each of these infield sections use a separate portion of the tri-oval to complete the track. During regular non-race weekends, multiple clubs can use the track by running on different infield sections. Also some of the infield sections can be run in either direction, or multiple infield sections can be put together – such as running the North Course and the South Course and using the tri-oval to connect the two.

Entry list 

*The #0 would withdraw due to one of the team's engines blowing up at the previous race. As a result, Thompson would replace Richmond in the #06 for the weekend.

Practice 
The only 45-minute practice session would take place on Friday, June 26.

Starting lineup 
The starting lineup was determined by the current 2020 owner's points. As a result, Michael Self of Venturini Motorsports would win the pole.

Full starting lineup

Race results

References 

2020 ARCA Menards Series
NASCAR races at Pocono Raceway
June 2020 sports events in the United States
2020 in sports in Pennsylvania